Franco David Shea (born 28 November 1997) is an Argentine professional footballer who plays as a forward.

Career
Shea is a graduate of Independiente. In June 2018, Shea agreed a loan move to Primera B Metropolitana side Colegiales. His professional football debut came in a defeat away from home to UAI Urquiza on 29 August, which preceded further appearances in goalless draws with Justo José de Urquiza and Deportivo Riestra in 2018–19; though he'd return to his parent Primera División team Independiente mid-season. Shea was immediately loaned back out, as he joined Ferrocarril Midland in Primera C Metropolitana. He remained for six months in tier four, but only appeared twice in competitive action.

On 3 August 2019, Shea switched Argentina for Greece after agreeing terms with Chania regional league side Paleochora. He renewed his contract twelve months later, following the club's promotion to the Gamma Ethniki. In April 2021, Shea joined fellow country club AEP Kozani.

Career statistics
.

References

External links

1997 births
Living people
Footballers from Rosario, Santa Fe
Argentine footballers
Association football forwards
Argentine expatriate footballers
Expatriate footballers in Greece
Argentine expatriate sportspeople in Greece
Primera B Metropolitana players
Primera C Metropolitana players
Club Atlético Independiente footballers
Club Atlético Colegiales (Argentina) players
Club Ferrocarril Midland players
AEP Kozani F.C. players